Jova may refer to:

Persons with the surname 
Henri Jova (1919–2014), American architect
Joseph J. Jova, American diplomat
Levente Jova (born 1992), Hungarian football player
Olvido Gara Jova (born 1963), (known as Alaska), Spanish-Mexican singer, DJ, and TV personality

Persons with the nickname
 Jovan Ilić, Serbian poet and politician
 Jovan Jovanović Zmaj, Serbian poet and physician
 Jovanotti, Italian musical artist
Jova Live 2002, released as a digital single

Other uses 
Hurricane Jova, several storms with the name
Jova (Novi Pazar), a village in Serbia
Jova people, a subgroup of the Opata people of Mexico
Jova language, extinct Uto-Aztecan language